El Tiempo is a newspaper published in Cuenca, Ecuador. It has been published since April 12, 1955.

References

External links
Official site

Newspapers published in Ecuador
Mass media in Cuenca, Ecuador